is a Japanese professional footballer who plays as a midfielder.

Club career

Early career
Iida played football at Yamanashi Gakuin University in Kōfu, Yamanashi Prefecture before moving to the United States to pursue a professional career as a footballer.

Kitsap
In April 2017, Iida signed with National Premier Soccer League side Kitsap SC after a trial period.

Clarkstown Eagles
Later in 2017, Iida signed for NPSL side Clarkstown Eagles, scoring three goals in six appearances as the club would go on to make the playoffs.

Washington Premier
In 2018, Iida played for American Evergreen Premier League side Washington Premier FC, scoring four goals in ten appearances and leading the club to a league title.

HFX Wanderers
In September 2018, Iida participated in the Canadian Premier League Open Trials and was named one of the top players from the Montreal trials by the league's coaches. On 21 February 2019, Iida signed his first professional contract with Canadian Premier League side HFX Wanderers. He made his debut as a substitute in Halifax's inaugural match on 28 April 2019. On 14 December 2019, the club announced that Iida would not be returning for the 2020 season.

OKC Energy FC
Iida signed with OKC Energy FC of the USL Championship in December 2019. He is the first Asian-born player signed by Energy FC.

RANS Nusantara
In May 2022, Iida signed for Liga 1 club RANS Nusantara following their promotion to the top tier of Indonesian football.

Honours
Washington Premier
Evergreen Premier League: 2018

References

External links

1994 births
Living people
Association football midfielders
Japanese footballers
Association football people from Ishikawa Prefecture
Yamanashi Gakuin University alumni
FC Motown players
HFX Wanderers FC players
RANS Nusantara F.C. players
Preston Lions FC players
National Premier Soccer League players
Canadian Premier League players
Japanese expatriate footballers
Expatriate soccer players in the United States
Japanese expatriate sportspeople in the United States
Expatriate soccer players in Canada
Japanese expatriate sportspeople in Canada
Expatriate footballers in Indonesia
Japanese expatriate sportspeople in Indonesia
Expatriate soccer players in Australia
Japanese expatriate sportspeople in Australia